A rain of animals is a rare meteorological phenomenon in which flightless animals fall from the sky. Such occurrences have been reported in many countries throughout history. One hypothesis is that tornadic waterspouts sometimes pick up creatures such as fish or frogs, and carry them for up to several miles. However, this aspect of the phenomenon has never been witnessed by scientists.

History 
Rain of flightless animals and things has been reported throughout history. In the first century AD, Roman naturalist Pliny the Elder documented storms of frogs and fish. In 1794, French soldiers saw toads fall from the sky during heavy rain at Lalain, near the French city of Lille. Rural inhabitants in Yoro, Honduras claim 'fish rain' happens there every summer, a phenomenon they call Lluvia de Peces.

Explanations 

French physicist André-Marie Ampère (1775–1836) was among the first scientists to take seriously accounts of raining animals. Addressing the Society of Natural Science, Ampère suggested that at times frogs and toads roam the countryside in large numbers, and that violent winds could pick them up and carry them great distances.

After a reported rain of fish in Singapore in 1861, French naturalist Francis de Laporte de Castelnau speculated that a migration of walking catfish had taken place, dragging themselves over land from one puddle to another, following the rain.

The likeliest explanation for many of the supposed cases is that there is no falling happening at all and the animals are driven along by winds or a deluge of some sort. This explanation also accounts for the prevalence of reports that only a single species or type of animal is ever reported raining from the sky.

A current scientific hypothesis involves tornadic waterspouts: a tornado that forms over the water. Under this hypothesis, a tornadic waterspout transports animals to relatively high altitudes, carrying them over large distances. This hypothesis appears supported by the type of animals in these rains: small and light, usually aquatic, and by the suggestion that the rain of animals is often preceded by a storm.  However, the theory does not account for how all the animals involved in each individual incident would be from only one species, and not a group of similarly sized animals from a single area. Further, the theory also does not account for a genuine tornadic waterspout not actually sucking objects up and carrying them rather than flinging objects out to the sides.

In the case of birds, storms may overcome a flock in flight, especially in times of migration. The Doppler image to the right shows an example wherein a group of bats is overtaken by a thunderstorm. In the image, the bats are in the red zone, which corresponds to winds moving away from the radar station, and enter into a mesocyclone associated with a tornado (in green). These events may occur easily with birds, which can get killed in flight, or stunned and then fall (unlike flightless creatures, which first have to be lifted into the air by an outside force). Sometimes this happens in large groups, for instance, the blackbirds falling from the sky in Beebe, Arkansas, United States on December 31, 2010. It is common for birds to become disoriented (for example, because of bad weather or fireworks) and collide with objects such as trees or buildings, killing them or stunning them into falling to their death. The number of blackbirds killed in Beebe is not spectacular considering the size of their congregations, which can be in the millions. The event in Beebe, however, captured the imagination and led to more reports in the media of birds falling from the sky across the globe, such as in Sweden and Italy, though many scientists claim such mass deaths are common occurrences but usually go unnoticed. In contrast, it is harder to find a plausible explanation for rains of terrestrial animals.

Some cases are thought to be caused by birds dropping fish. With regard to a documented rain of fish that occurred on December 29, 2021 in Texarkana, Texas, independent researchers Sharon A. Hill and Paul Cropper proposed that the fish had been dropped or possibly regurgitated by passing birds.  The theory found some favor with airport workers who had cleaned up the fish; they noted that there were birds in the area around the same time, and the fish "were kind of chewed up." In June 2022 around the San Francisco coast, a boom of anchovies is likely to be the cause of fair weather falling of fish from birds' mouths, such as pelicans.

Occurrences 
The following list is a selection of examples.

Fish 

 Singapore, February 22, 1861
 Tarai, Nepal, May 15, 1900
 Moose Jaw, Saskatchewan, Canada, July 1, 1903
 Marksville, Louisiana, October 23, 1947
 Ilorin, Kwara State, Nigeria, May 19, 1993
 Knighton, Powys, Wales, 18 August 2004
 Kerala State, India, February 12, 2008
 Bhanwad, Jamnagar, India, October 24, 2009
 Lajamanu, Northern Territory, Australia, February 25 and 26, 2010
Loreto, Agusan del Sur, Philippines, January 13, 2012
 IIT Madras, Chennai, Tamil Nadu, India September 12, 2013
The annual Lluvia de Peces in Yoro, Honduras
 Chilaw, Sri Lanka, 6 May 2014
 Nandigama, Andhra Pradesh India, 19 June 2015,

 Guntur, Andhra Pradesh India, 16 August 2015
 Dire Dawa, Ethiopia, 20 January 2016
 Pathapatnam, Srikakulam district, Andhra Pradesh, 19 May 2016
  Philadelphia, Pennsylvania, 9 September 2016
 Mexico, Tamaulipas, Tampico, 26 September 2017
 Oroville, California, 16 May 2017
 Jaffna, Sri Lanka, 7 November 2017
Texarkana,Texas, 30 December 2021

Spiders 
 Albury, Australia, 1974
 Santo Antônio da Platina, Brazil, February 3, 2013
Goulburn, Australia, 15 May 2015

Frogs and toads 
 Ishikawa Prefecture, Japan, June 2009 (occurrences reported throughout the month)
 Rákóczifalva, Hungary, 18–20 June 2010 (twice)
Cabo Polonio, Uruguay, Since 2011 (twice)

Others 
 Jellyfish: Bath, England, 1894
 Worms: Jennings, Louisiana, July 11, 2007
 Various marine animals, including octopuses, seashells and starfish: Qingdao, Shandong Province, China, June 13, 2018

Examples in popular culture 
 Magnolia
 Sharknado (film series)
 Watchmen (TV series)
 Fuego gris (also here: at the article's Spanish version).
 JoJo’s Bizarre Adventure Part 6: Stone Ocean (manga/anime series)
Fargo (TV series)

See also 
 Blood rain
 Flying fish
 Lluvia de Peces, (Honduras, "Fish rain")
 Red rain in Kerala
 Star jelly
 Raining cats and dogs
 Kentucky meat shower

References

Further reading
 Bajkov, A.D.  Do fish fall from the sky?  Science, v. 109, April 22, 1949: 402. 
 Bourchier, Daniel.  “It’s raining fish…no really.”  Sunday Territorian, Australia, February 28, 2010.
 Branley, Franklyn M.  It's raining cats and dogs: all kinds of weather and why we have it.  Illustrated by True Kelley.  Boston, Houghton Mifflin, 1987.  112 p.  (Juvenile)
 Cerveny, Randall S.  Freaks of the storm: from flying cows to stealing thunder, the world's strangest true weather stories.  New York, Thunder's Mouth Press, c2006.  371 p.  
 Chandler, Barb.  Froggy weather.  Weather-wise, v. 57, Jan./Feb. 2004: 42.
 Christian, Spencer and Antonia Felix.  Can it really rain frogs?:  the world's strangest weather events.  New York, Wiley, 1997.  121 p. (Juvenile).
 Corliss, William.  Tornados, dark days, anomalous precipitation, and related weather phenomena: a catalog of geophysical anomalies.  Glen Arm, MD: Sourcebook Project, c1983.  196 p.
 Dennis, Jerry.  It's raining frogs and fishes: four seasons of natural phenomena and oddities of the sky.  New York, HarperCollins, c1992.  323 p.
 Englebert, Phillis. The complete weather resource. Detroit, UXL, c1997–2000.  4  v.
 “Frogs fall from the sky.”  Herald Sun, Melbourne, Australia, June 8, 2005.  p. 2.
 Gray, J. E.  The shower of fishes.  Zoologist; a monthly journal of natural history, v. 17, 1859: 6540–6541
 Gudger, E. W.  Do fish fall from the sky with rain?  Scientific Monthly, v. 29, December 1929: 523–527.
 McAtee, Waldo L. Showers of organic matter. Monthly Weather Review, v. 45, May 1917: 217–224.
 Posey, Carl A.  The living earth book of wind and weather.  Pleasantville, NY, Reader's Digest Association, c1994.  224 p.
 Waterspouts. In McGraw-Hill concise encyclopedia of science and technology.  5th edition.  New York, McGraw-Hill, c2005.  pp. 2369–2370.

External links 

 Raining cats and dogs
 Mysterious Falls from the Sky. A review on the American perspective.
 10 Craziest Things To Fall From the Sky
 Fafrotskies. (An acronym for falls from the skies)

Anomalous weather
Animals in popular culture